CNSA is the China National Space Administration, the national space agency of China.

CNSA may also refer to:

Organizations
 China National School of Administration, the former name of the Chinese Academy of Governance
 Comité National de Secours et d'Alimentation, a humanitarian organization in Belgium in World War I
 Canadian Nursing Students' Association; See Nursing in Canada
 California Nursing Student Association; See Golden West College
 Caisse nationale de solidarité pour l'autonomie the French National Solidarity Fund for Autonomy

Other uses
 Commercial National Security Algorithm Suite, the replacement of the NSA Suite B Cryptography